HMS Bulldog was a  designed by Sir William Symonds, Surveyor of the Navy. After commissioning she sailed for the Cape of Good Hope. She then was in the Baltic Sea for the Russian War. She carried out ocean sounding for the Atlantic telegraph. She was lost  while in action with the Haitians in 1865.

Bulldog was the third vessel so named since it was used for a 16-gun sloop, launched by Ladd of Dover on 10 November 1782, made a bomb in 1798, converted to a powder hulk 1801 Breaking completed at Portsmouth in December 1829. The vessel had been in French hands from 27 February 1801 to 16 September 1801.

Construction
She was ordered on 18 March 1841 from Chatham Dockyard though her keel was not laid until 7 July 1844. She was launched on 2 October 1845. Following her launch she was towed to the East India Dock to have her boilers and machinery fitted. She was then towed to Chatham and was completed for sea on 7 September 1846 at an initial cost of £58,122 including the hull at £23,342, machinery at £24,892 and fitting at £8,338.

Commissioned Service

First Commission
She was commissioned at Devonport under Commander George Evans Davis, RN on 25 June 1846 for service on the Cape of Good Hope Station. By December she was back in Devonport. Commander Astley Cooper Key, RN took command on 4 May 1847 and assigned to the Mediterranean. She returned paying off on 16 April 1850.

Second commission
She commissioned on 23 January 1854 under the command of Commander William King Hall, RN for service in the Baltic Sea during the Russian War. She was the flagship of Sir Robert Napier during the bombardment of Bomarsund on 16 August 1854. In February 1855 her new commander was Commander Alexander Crombie Gordon, RN for her return to the Baltic. By December 1856 she had been assigned to particular service.  She was paid off into steam reserve on 25 March 1857.

Third Commission
On 2 June 1860 she was commissioned under Sir Francis Leopold McClintock for ocean sounding for the Atlantic Telegraph. Commander Henry Frederick McKillop, RN took command on 3 December 1860. During 1861 she was fitted with Armstrong guns before proceeding to the North America and West Indies Station.

Fourth Commission
In March 1864 she was commissioned for service on the North American and West Indies Station under the command of Captain Charles Wake, RN.

Loss
She was in action at Cape Haytien with Haitian ships and forts on 23 October 1865. She sank the Haitian ships Valorogue and a schooner before she was run around then deliberately blown up.

Notes

Citations

References
 Lyon Winfield, The Sail & Steam Navy List, All the Ships of the Royal Navy 1815 to 1889, by David Lyon & Rif Winfield, published by Chatham Publishing, London © 2004, 
 Winfield, British Warships in the Age of Sail (1817 – 1863), by Rif Winfield, published by Seaforth Publishing, England © 2014, e, Chapter 11 Steam Paddle Vessels, Vessels acquired since November 1830, Stromboli Class
 Colledge, Ships of the Royal Navy, by J.J. Colledge, revised and updated by Lt Cdr Ben Warlow and Steve Bush, published by Seaforth Publishing, Barnsley, Great Britain, 2020, e  (EPUB)
 The New Navy List, conducted by Joseph Allen, Esq., RN, London: Parker, Furnivall, and Parker, Military Library, Whitehall, MDCCCXLVII
 The Navy List, published by His Majesty's Stationery Office, London

Paddle sloops of the Royal Navy
Sloop classes